The 2017 Singapore Grand Prix (formally known as the 2017 Formula 1 Singapore Airlines Singapore Grand Prix) was a Formula One motor race held on 17 September 2017 at the Marina Bay Street Circuit in Marina Bay, Singapore. It was the fourteenth round of the 2017 FIA Formula One World Championship, and marked the eighteenth running of the Singapore Grand Prix, the tenth time the race had been held at Marina Bay.

Mercedes driver Lewis Hamilton entered the round with a three-point lead over Ferrari's Sebastian Vettel in the World Drivers' Championship, with Valtteri Bottas third. In the Constructors' standings, Mercedes led Ferrari by 62 points, while Red Bull Racing were third.

The race was won by Mercedes's Lewis Hamilton who took the lead on the first lap following a significant collision between Sebastian Vettel, Max Verstappen and Kimi Räikkönen. Daniel Ricciardo finished second with Valtteri Bottas taking third. This result increased Hamilton's lead in the Drivers' Championship to 28 points and increased Mercedes's lead in the Constructors' standings to 102 points.

Report

Practice 
Red Bull's Daniel Ricciardo went fastest in first practice with a time of 1:42.489. He was followed by the Ferrari of Sebastian Vettel and his teammate Max Verstappen while championship leader Lewis Hamilton was only fourth fastest. Ricciardo was also quickest in second practice, followed by Verstappen and Hamilton.

Qualifying 
Max Verstappen was quickest in both Q1 and Q2 as Red Bull seemed to have the advantage over Mercedes and Ferrari. However, Ferrari's Sebastian Vettel took pole in the final session with a lap time of 1.39.491, ahead of Verstappen and teammate Ricciardo. Championship leader Lewis Hamilton could only take fifth on the grid with teammate Bottas sixth.

Race 
Rainfall prior to the race start meant that the race would be the first night-time Grand Prix staged under wet conditions in Formula One history. Despite this, the race was started under normal racing conditions without the safety car as per 2017 rule changes. At the start, Räikkönen had an excellent start compared to his teammate Vettel and Verstappen of Red Bull. Vettel and Räikkönen had Verstappen in the middle of them with him nowhere to go. Verstappen's tyres touched with Räikkönen as a result sending Räikkönen out of control and he hit left sidepod of his teammate Vettel's car, causing significant damage to both, and then also hit Verstappen's car again going into turn 1. This caused the immediate retirement of both Räikkönen and Verstappen. Vettel was initially able to continue despite noticeable damage, followed by Hamilton, who had a good start with Ricciardo behind. However, Vettel soon spun due to the damage and subsequently retired. This marked the first occasion in Formula One history when both works Ferraris were eliminated on the opening lap. Alonso had also sustained damage as a result of the incident in turn 1 and eventually retired on lap 9. The collisions on the opening lap brought out a safety car that led the field until lap 4. At the restart Lewis Hamilton continued to lead, followed by Daniel Ricciardo in second and Nico Hülkenberg in third. Hamilton then was able to pull away and establish a comfortable lead over Ricciardo.

There were two further safety car periods over the course of the race. One on lap 11, after Daniil Kvyat crashed at turn 7, and one on lap 38 after Marcus Ericsson spun. Bottas managed to get up to third and Carlos Sainz to fourth after the first safety car period as those on full wets ahead of them pitted for inters, the tyres Bottas and Sainz were already on. Hamilton was again able to get away well at both restarts. Kevin Magnussen and Nico Hülkenberg – from 4th position after passing Sainz in the second safety car period – would both retire later in the race with mechanical issues. Hamilton won the race from Ricciardo, and Valtteri Bottas took the final podium place, while Sainz achieved his then career-best finish of 4th place. Jolyon Palmer came home in 6th place for his first points finish of the season, on the same weekend it was announced he would be replaced by Sainz at the end of the season. The drivers did not complete the scheduled race distance of 61 laps due to the 2-hour time limit being reached, so the chequered flag was shown on lap 58.

Classification

Qualifying

Notes
 – Marcus Ericsson received a 5-place grid penalty for an unscheduled gearbox change.

Race

Championship standings after the race

Drivers' Championship standings

Constructors' Championship standings

 Note: Only the top five positions are included for both sets of standings.

References

Singapore Grand Prix
Singapore
Grand Prix
Singapore Grand Prix